CarFest is an annual family music and motoring festival held in Cheshire and Hampshire, England. It was founded by the radio presenter Chris Evans in 2011, and raises funds for Children in Need, a British charity. The festival presents a variety of entertainment - live music performances, track shows, "celebrity chef" demos, driving experiences, a steam fair, a fundraising family fun run and a carnival fancy dress parade.

Dates 
Both events have taken place annually since 2012, with the exception of 2020 when they were cancelled due to Covid-19. The North event has been held at 3 locations throughout Cheshire, including Cholmondeley Castle, Oulton Park, and the Bolesworth Estate, with the South event being held at Laverstoke Park Farm in Overton, Hampshire every year since its debut.

Scalextric 

For the 2015 CarFest South, former F1 driver Martin Brundle created a 45-metre Scalextric circuit.

Air crash 

During the 2015 event, held at Oulton Park, Cheshire, a Folland Gnat aircraft, one of pair performing a display, crashed into the ground, killing the pilot, Kevin Whyman.

CarFest Supergroup

Richard Jones of "The Feeling" put together the CarFest Supergroup, on behalf of Evans, who released a live double album for the 10th anniversary of the music and motoring festival, with the profits going to a number of charities including the Teenage Cancer Trust and the Starlight Children’s Foundation. Vocalists/musicians on the album include Roger Daltrey, KT Tunstall, Gary Kemp, Ricky Wilson and Jones' wife Sophie Ellis-Bextor.

References 

2012 establishments in England
Recurring events established in 2012
Festivals in England
Car Show